The W&W Subdivision is a railroad line owned by CSX Transportation in the U.S. state of North Carolina. The line runs from just south of Wilson, North Carolina, to Wallace, North Carolina, for a total of 69.1 miles. At its north end the line connects to CSX's A Line (South End Subdivision).  The line's name stands for the Wilmington and Weldon Railroad, the company that originally built the line (as well as the A Line north to Weldon).

History
The Wilmington and Weldon Railroad was completed in 1840 and was the longest railroad in the world at the time of its completion.  In 1899, the Wilmington and Weldon Railroad was merged into the Atlantic Coast Line Railroad (ACL).  The line provided service to the port city of Wilmington, North Carolina where the ACL was headquartered from 1900 to 1960.

In 1909, the ACL realigned the track in Goldsboro to bypass the center of town in conjunction with the opening of Goldsboro Union Station.  The line's original alignment along Center Street was removed in 1925.

In 1967, the ACL merged with its rival, the Seaboard Air Line Railroad (SAL), who also served Wilmington via a line that originated in Hamlet (the Wilmington Subdivision).  The merged company was named the Seaboard Coast Line Railroad (SCL), who designated the line as the W&W Subdivision.

In 1980, the Seaboard Coast Line's parent company merged with the Chessie System, creating the CSX Corporation.  The CSX Corporation initially operated the Chessie and Seaboard Systems separately until 1986, when they were merged into CSX Transportation.  Also in 1986, CSX abandoned the W&W Subdivision from Wilmington to Wallace, where the line terminates today.  The Wilmington Subdivision is now CSX's only line serving Wilmington.

Clinton Spur
The Clinton Spur line runs from Warsaw to Clinton for a total of 11.3 miles. Part of this line is operated by the Clinton Railroad.  The Clinton Spur was originally built as the Wilmington and Weldon Railroad's Clinton Branch in 1887.

See also
 List of CSX Transportation lines

References

CSX Transportation lines